Yığınlı, also known as Küçük Araptar, is a village in the Şehitkamil District, Gaziantep Province, Turkey. The village is inhabited by Turkmens and had a population of 1399 in 2021.

References

Villages in Şehitkamil District